Nußbach (Nussbach) may refer to:

 Nußbach, Austria, in Upper Austria, Austria
 Nußbach, Rhineland-Palatinate, in Rhineland-Palatinate, Germany
 Nußbach, the German name for Măieruş, Braşov, in Romania